Sadr al-Din may refer to:

Sadr al-Din al-Qunawi (died 1274), Persian Sufi writer
Sadr al-Dīn Mūsā (1305–1391), leader of the Safaviya order
Sadr ad-Dīn Abu'l Ḥasan ʿAlī Ibn Abi al-Izz (1331–1390), Syrian Sunni Hanafi jurist and theologian
Pir Sadardin (14th century), Persian founder of Khoja Ismaili sect
Ṣadr ad-Dīn Muḥammad Shīrāzī, or just Mulla Sadra (c. 1571–1636), Persian Shia Islamic philosopher
Sadreddin Nizamettinovich Maksudov, or Sadri Maksudi Arsal (1878–1957), Tatar and Turkish statesman
Sadriddin Ayni (1878–1954), Tajik poet, journalist, historian
Sadr al-Din bin Saleh (late 19th century), Twelver Shi'a religious scholar
Sadr al-Din al-Sadr (1882–1954) Iraqi ayatollah
Sadr-ud-Din (Lahore Ahmadiyya leader) (died 1981), second Emir of the Lahore Ahmadiyya Movement, active in Berlin
Mehmet Sadrettin Alışık, or just Sadri Alışık (1925–1995), Turkish film actor
Prince Sadruddin Aga Khan (1933–2003), French Muslim United Nations official
Ali Sadreddine Bayanouni (born 1938), Syrian active in the Muslim Brotherhood
Saddaruddin Hashwani (born 1940), Pakistani businessman

Arabic masculine given names